The Neff's Mill Covered Bridge or Bowman's Mill Covered Bridge is a covered bridge that spans the Pequea Creek on the border between West Lampeter Township and Strasburg Township in Lancaster County, Pennsylvania, United States. A county-owned and maintained bridge, its official designation is the Pequea #7 Bridge.

The bridge has a single span, wooden, double Burr arch trusses design with the addition of steel hanger rods. The deck is made from oak planks.  It is painted red, the traditional color of Lancaster County covered bridges, on both the inside and outside. Both approaches to the bridge are painted in the traditional white color. It is purportedly the narrowest covered bridge in the county.

The bridge's WGCB Number is 38-36-22. Added in 1980, it is listed on the National Register of Historic Places as structure number 80003538.  It is located at  (39.97883, -76.22583), on Penn Grant Road 1.25 miles to the east of U.S. Route 222 and to the south of Lampeter, Pennsylvania and Pennsylvania Route 741.

History
The covered bridge was originally built by Christian Brackbill in 1824 for an unknown cost. It was known as Bowman's Mill Covered Bridge. It was rebuilt in 1875 by James C. Carpenter at a cost of $1,860. Note: This is the narrowest covered bridge in the county.

Dimensions 
Length: 90 feet (27.4 m) span and  total lengthNote:
Width:  clear deck and  total widthNote:
Overhead clearance: Note:
Under clearance:

Gallery

See also
Burr arch truss
List of Lancaster County covered bridges

References 

Covered bridges in Lancaster County, Pennsylvania
Bridges completed in 1875
Covered bridges on the National Register of Historic Places in Pennsylvania
National Register of Historic Places in Lancaster County, Pennsylvania
Road bridges on the National Register of Historic Places in Pennsylvania
Wooden bridges in Pennsylvania
Burr Truss bridges in the United States